Amanda Röntgen-Maier (20 February 1853 – 15 July 1894) was a Swedish violinist and composer. She was the first female graduate in music direction from the Royal College of Music in Stockholm in 1872.

Biography 
Amanda Maier was born into a musical home in Landskrona and discovered her musical talent early. Her first instruction in violin and piano was from her father. At the age of sixteen, Maier began studying at the Royal College of Music in Stockholm, where she studied violin, organ, piano, cello, composition and harmony.

Maier performed violin concerts in both Sweden and abroad. She continued to study composition with the conservatory teachers Reinecke and Richter in Leipzig and violin from Engelbert Röntgen, concert master at Gewandhaus Orchestra in the same city. During this time she composed a violin sonata, a piano trio and a violin concerto for orchestra. Her violin concerto was premiered in 1875 with Maier as soloist and received good reviews.

In Leipzig she met the German-Dutch pianist and composer Julius Röntgen (1855–1932), her violin teacher's son. The couple married in 1880 in Landskrona and moved to Amsterdam. The marriage ended Amanda's public appearances, but she continued composing, and the couple arranged musical salons and music performances in Europe, with audience members including Nina and Edvard Grieg, Anton Rubinstein, Joseph Joachim, Clara Schumann and Johannes Brahms. In the late 1870s Maier also met Ethel Smyth, who was studying in Leipzig. They became friends and continued corresponding until Maier's death.

In 1887 Röntgen-Maier became ill with tuberculosis. During her illness, the couple stayed in Nice and Davos. Her final major composition was the piano quartet in E minor on a trip to Norway in 1891.  She died in 1894 in Amsterdam, the Netherlands.

The Swedish record label dB Productions has released two of three albums in a series of Amanda Maier's complete works. Excerpts can be found on Youtube.

Works 
Selected works include:

Sonata in B Minor for Violin and Piano (Publisher: Musikaliska Konstföreningen, Stockholm, 1878)
Six Pieces for Piano and Violin (Publisher: Breitkopf & Hartel, Leipzig, 1879)
Dialogues: Small Piano Pieces (with Julius Röntgen, Publisher: Breitkopf & Hartel, Leipzig, 1882)
 String Quartet in A major (1877 – completed by B. Tommy Andersson in 2018)

Legacy
In 2018 a string quartet was formed by members the Royal Stockholm Philharmonic Orchestra, and named the Maier Quartet.

References

Further reading

External links 

 .
 
 Amanda Maier, Sonata in B Minor, I. Allegro – Gregory Maytan (violin), Nicole Lee (piano)
 Amanda Maier, Sonata in B Minor, II. Andantino – Gregory Maytan (violin), Nicole Lee (piano)
 Amanda Maier, Sonata in B Minor, III. Allegro molto vivace – Gregory Maytan (violin), Nicole Lee (piano)
 Amanda Maier, Six Pieces for Violin and Piano, Gregory Maytan (violin), Nicole Lee (piano)  I. Allegro vivace  II. Allegro con moto III. Lento - IV. Allegro Molto  V. Tranquillamente  VI. Allegro, ma non troppo

1853 births
1894 deaths
Swedish classical violinists
Women classical composers
19th-century classical composers
19th-century classical violinists
Women classical violinists
Swedish classical composers
People from Landskrona Municipality
Royal College of Music, Stockholm alumni
Swedish women composers
19th-century Swedish musicians
19th-century Swedish women musicians
19th-century women composers